Cinéma vérité ("truthful cinema") is a style of documentary filmmaking developed by Edgar Morin and Jean Rouch, inspired by Dziga Vertov's theory about Kino-Pravda. It combines improvisation with use of the camera to unveil truth or highlight subjects hidden behind reality.
It is sometimes called observational cinema, if understood as pure direct cinema: mainly without a narrator's voice-over. There are subtle, yet important, differences between terms expressing similar concepts. Direct cinema is largely concerned with the recording of events in which the subject and audience become unaware of the camera's presence: operating within what Bill Nichols, an American historian and theoretician of documentary film, calls the "observational mode", a fly on the wall. Many therefore see a paradox in drawing attention away from the presence of the camera and simultaneously interfering in the reality it registers when attempting to discover a cinematic truth.

History 
Cinéma vérité can involve stylized set-ups and interaction between the filmmaker and the subject, even to the point of provocation. Some argue that the obvious presence of the filmmaker and camera was seen by most cinéma vérité filmmakers as the best way to reveal the truth. The camera is always acknowledged, for it performs the act of filming real objects, people, and events in a confrontational way. The filmmaker's intention was to represent the truth as objectively as possible, freeing the viewer from deceptions in how those aspects of life were formerly presented to them. From this perspective, the filmmaker should be the catalyst of a situation. Few agree on the meanings of these terms, even the filmmakers whose films are being described.

Pierre Perrault sets situations up and then films them, for example in Pour la suite du monde (1963) where he asked old people to fish for whale. The result is not a documentary about whale fishing; it is about memory and lineage.  In this sense cinéma vérité is concerned with anthropological cinema, and with the social and political implications of what is captured on film. How a filmmaker shoots a film, what is being filmed, what to do with what was filmed, and how that film will be presented to an audience, all were very important for filmmakers of the time.

In all cases, the ethical and aesthetic analysis of documentary form (see docufiction) of the 1950s and 1960s has to be linked with a critical look at post-war propaganda analysis. This type of cinema is concerned with notions of truth and reality in film. Feminist documentary films of the 1970s often used cinéma-vérité techniques. This sort of "realism" was criticized for its deceptive pseudo-natural construction of reality.

Edgar Morin coined the term around the time of such essential films as 1960's Primary and his own 1961 collaboration with Jean Rouch, Chronicle of a Summer.

Filmmakers associated with the style 
Pioneers
 Robert Drew
 Richard Leacock
 D. A. Pennebaker
 Jean Rouch
Others
 Lindsay Anderson
 Tony Richardson
 Karel Reisz
 Shirley Clarke
 Chris Marker
 The Maysles Brothers (Albert and David Maysles)
 Frederick Wiseman
 John Cassavetes
 Barbara Kopple
Peter Watkins

Selected cinéma-vérité films
 Primary (1960)
Chronicle of a Summer (1961)
Happy Mother's Day (1964)
Dont Look Back (1967)
Portrait of Jason (1967)
 Titicut Follies (1967)
Faces (1968)
 High School (1968)
 Salesman (1969)
Wanda (1970)
Multiple Maniacs (1970)
Gimme Shelter (1970)
 The Plaint of Steve Kreines as recorded by his younger brother Jeff (1974)
 Grey Gardens (1975)
The Decline of Western Civilization (1981) and the sequel The Metal Years (1988)
The Atomic Cafe (1982)
Say Amen, Somebody (1982)
Streetwise (1984)
Sherman's March  (1986)
Paris Is Burning (1990)
The War Room (1993)
Hoop Dreams (1994)
Slam (1998)
Tarnation (2003)
Control Room (2004)
Take Out (2004)
Daddy Longlegs (2009)
The Florida Project (2017)
Dick Johnson Is Dead (2020)
Cow (2021)
Jeen-Yuhs (2022)

Legacy
Many film directors of the 1960s and later adopted use of handheld camera and other cinéma vérité aspects for their scripted, fiction filmshaving actors improvise to get a more spontaneous quality in their dialogue and action. Influential examples include director John Cassavetes, who broke ground with his film Faces. The techniques of cinéma vérité can also be seen in fiction films from The Blair Witch Project to Saving Private Ryan.

Cinéma vérité was also adapted for use in scripted TV programs, such as Homicide: Life on the Street, NYPD Blue, both the UK and American versions of The Office, Parks & Recreation  and Modern Family. Documentary series are less common, but COPS is one famous non-fictional example.

It has also been a subject ripe for parodies and spoofs such as the mockumentary film This Is Spinal Tap and Emmy Award-nominated TV series Documentary Now (the latter paying homage to the style of such CV classics as Grey Gardens and The War Room).

See also
Cinéma Vérité: Defining the Moment
Cinema Verite – the 2011 HBO TV movie about the making of PBS's 1973 documentary series An American Family
Ethnofiction
Found footage (pseudo-documentary)
Pilottone
Sync sound
16 mm film

References

External links
 REALISM, article by Robert McConnell at Parlez-vous.com
 Cinéma Vérité at Encyclopædia Britannica
 
 Cinéma Vérité: Defining The Moment, IMDb.

Documentary film styles
New Wave in cinema
Film genres
1960s in film
1970s in film
1980s in film
1990s in film
2000s in film
2010s in film
2020s in film
1960s neologisms